The Heythrop Journal is a bimonthly peer-reviewed academic journal covering the relations between philosophy and theology. The journal is published by Wiley-Blackwell and was sponsored by Heythrop College (London). With the closure of Heythrop College the journal moved to Campion Hall, Oxford and is sponsored by the Society of Jesus in Britain. The journal was established in 1960 by Bruno Brinkman SJ. The editor-in-chief is Patrick Madigan  (Campion Hall, Oxford).

Abstracting and indexing 
The journal is abstracted and indexed in:

External links 
 
 Print: 
 Online: 

Bimonthly journals
Philosophy journals
Jesuit publications
Philosophy of religion literature
Religious studies journals
English-language journals
Publications established in 1960
Wiley-Blackwell academic journals